Stephan Swanson came to prominence as a marine researcher when he successfully placed the satellite transmitter on the famous Great white shark Nicole, the first great white shark ever to be tracked on a 20,000 kilometer migration from South Africa to Australia and back. Due to his ability to handle large marine predators, such as the great white shark, he was contracted as an expedition biologist to travel to Guadeloupe and place satellite transmitters on the dorsal fins of Great Whites. His historical capture and release of a 5m long, 1800 kilogram great white shark is documented in the National Geographic Marine Special "Ultimate Shark".

Swanson is currently co-owner of False Bay White Shark Adventures (trading as Shark Explorers) which was established in 2008. They provide shark scuba diving excursions.

Scientific Articles
 Developing techniques and procedures for large shark telemetry
 White shark abundance not a causative factor in shark attack incidence
 White shark cage diving - Cause for concern?
 Transoceanic migrations of a white shark

Television appearances
 Ultimate Shark - National Geographic
Sharkville - National Geographic archived from the original at the Wayback Machine
 Pasella - SABC2

References

External links
 Stephan Swanson at ResearchGate
 Project To Monitor The Great White Shark archived from the original at the Wayback Machine
 Transoceanic Migration, Spatial Dynamics, and Population Linkages of White Sharks
 Shark Nicole to Australia and Back

1967 births
Living people
People from Cape Town